Clitoria mariana, known by the common names butterfly pea and Atlantic pigeon wings, is a perennial herbaceous plant in the pea family, Fabaceae. The plant is native to the United States.

Description

The ascending, sometimes twining stem of Clitoria mariana is 45 to 60 centimeters long. The leaves are pinnately trifoliate, borne on petioles with stipules. The thin, smooth or slightly hairy leaflets are ovate, 2.5 to 11 centimeters long, and 1.5 to 5 centimeters wide.

It produces purple flowers in summer. The flowers are axillary, usually solitary, and resupinate. The calyx is tubular. The corolla of the flower is about 5 centimeters long, its wings and keel much shorter than the standard.

The fruit is a linear oblong pod, 25 millimeters long and 5 millimeters wide.

Distribution
The plant is native to the eastern, southern, and central United States west to New Mexico and Arizona. It is also found in Asia, in: Bhutan, India, Laos, Myanmar, Thailand, Vietnam, and southern China (Guangxi, Yunnan) 

In the United States it has been recorded in Alabama, Arkansas, Arizona, Washington, D.C., Delaware, Florida, Georgia, Iowa, Illinois, Indiana, Kansas, Kentucky, Louisiana, Maryland, Minnesota, Missouri, Mississippi, North Carolina, Nebraska, New Jersey, New Mexico, New York, Ohio, Oklahoma, Pennsylvania, South Carolina, Tennessee, Texas, Virginia, Wisconsin, and West Virginia.

Ecology
It is a larval host to the long-tailed skipper.

Conservation
It is listed as an endangered species by the states of New Jersey and Pennsylvania. The range of Clitoria mariana also includes parts of India, Bhutan, Laos, Myanmar, Thailand, Vietnam, and the Chinese provinces of Guangxi, and Yunnan. In Virginia, it grows in habitats such as dry open forests, shale barrens, and rocky or sandy woodlands. The presence of this species is dependent on appropriate habitat, and it may be eliminated from an area by development, changes in land use, or competition with invasive species.

References

External links
 USDA Plants Profile for Clitoria mariana (Atlantic pigeonwings)
 GRIN Database: Clitoria mariana

mariana
Flora of North America
Plants described in 1753
Taxa named by Carl Linnaeus